= Consumerism and social media =

Social media is argued to have completely changed the nature of consumerism and the consumer market, shifting not only the way people consume but consumer decisions and behaviour. Social media has shifted marketing, expanding the opportunity for business growth , allowing companies to reach more audiences across the globe. With social media being a huge part of modern day life, it is the perfect place for busiesses and organisations to grow their capital. Social media platforms such as facebook, TikTok and instagram ,as some examples, have become ubiquitous, petetrating the sphere of communication, argued to have become not only platforms for said communication but they serve as complex 'ecosystems for commerce'. However, this cultural shift is heavily speculated with cirtics hilighting issues surrounding social media and consumerism such as privacy and data concerns, concerns about the rise and effects of the 'influencer', algorithmic marketing and influential design of such platforms.

== Defining social media ==
Social media are platforms through which people can virtually communicate. Social media is hugely associated with the conditions of the 21st century with a recent report in 2026 stating that there are over 5.81 Billion 'user idenetities' across the globe.

Social media technologies is argued to fit into three main categories; social networking, collaboration and content sharing, with platforms saturated in huge amounts of user generated content. Social media is argued to have innately transformed the realm of communication, shrinking the time and space of communication. Platforms such as instagram, facebook and Tik Tok allow individuals to share messages such as videos and virtual imagery to people across the globe within a matter of seconds. This has been theorised that individuals are now within a virtual 'global village'.Essentially this 'global village' is a shared digital community where space is an irrelevant limitation to communication and connection. From a more critical perspective, social media is also defined as a platform whereby values and perceptions of users can be shared and ultimately shifted on a widespread scale which is essential in understanding the relationship between social media and consumerism. However, critics argue that this argument largely ignores user agency within the communication process.

== Influencers and social media ==
A main feature of Social media is the ability for individuals to gain mass amounts of following, this feature of social media has given rise to the 'influencer', which has become a popular topic within the field of social media and consumerism. In 2023 alone, the global influencer marketing market was estimated over USD 21 Billion. The term 'influencer' is regarded as an individual withholding the power to shape opinion and persuade people to buy. They are considered as one of the most influential factors which has changed modern marketing, considered as a powerful commercial tool in creating engaging, authentic and personal content to sell a product to a buyer, transcending traditional marketing, opening new opportunities for trust and reliability than advertising made by the company themselves.

=== Ethical concerns of 'The influencer' ===
the influencer has transformed traditional forms of marketing, bringing new commercial advantages, new forms of brand endorsement and brand exposure is ever present within the social media realm. Despite this, there are considerable amounts of ethical concerns in influencer marketing especially in regards to younger generations including Gen Z and Generation Alpha. One major concern is the concern that there is an increase in 'covert' marketing. Legally, sponsored content has to declare that they are advertisements, traditional media forms are arguable distinct in their transparency of being ads, however, it may be hard to distinguish what influencer content may be advertisements within their usual content. furthermore, influencers are notable in their ability to gain parasocial connection with audiences, gaining trust with their audiences, potentially holding the ability to influence consumer behaviour, some even speculating that this is a form of manipulation.

==== Audience agency ====
Despite these concerns, this perspective may overestimate the power influencers actually hold, ignoring consumer agency in their decision making. Audiences are not necessarily always passive when they consume materialistic content or content made by influencers, aiming to persuade audiences to consume. Research suggests audiences have an awareness of marketing material on instagram. They show awareness of brand tags in content and paid partnership labels, which can be driving factors in persuasion and audiences action. Furthermore, influencer research may universalise the 'influencer' in having the same power in persuading their audience. In addition, the intended messages that are intentional encoded on audiences 'to buy' may not be reciprocated in the preferred way. According to Stuart Hall, cultural signs and symbols are polysemic in meaning, meaning messages are received and interpreted differently across individuals. An individual may see a targeted ad and hold the oppositional reading to that message, rejecting the intended message that audiences need a certain product. However this argument itself can be contested, Stuart Halls model is outdated, linking to messaging on Television rather than new forms of media such as social media. Therefore new mechanisms such as the algorithm, digital reinforcement and feedback loops are not considered within this perspective.

== Trends and fads ==
Social media is known for having short-lived trends relating to topics such as beauty, lifestyle, physical fitness, fashion, and many more. Furthermore, many of these fads encourage consumptive behavior, which promotes various material items and making name-brand products desirable to the public. Some of the more recent trends in 2023 consist of hygiene and wellness products such as snail mucin, sea moss, stylish tote bags, insulated water bottles, as well as a myriad of eco-friendly products for those what are trying to take a more sustainable route to consumption. Because these trends don't last too long, they are often replaced by a newer trend, and often forgotten about within a short period of time.

== Data behind the spending ==
In general, positive correlations have been found between materialism, consumption, and social media engagement. One of the main reasons for this is due to the fact that the process of shopping, from the introduction of a product to the point of purchase, happens in minutes. Social media has made it very easy for users to find new products on the market, and provide them with online options of payment and delivery. Additionally, because social media users usually follow the content of those who are similar to them, their opinions carry more weight for consumers, and make products more desirable. With the introduction of more influencers, comes more possible products to sell, reaching a larger audience and motivating viewers to purchase. Therefore, this whole process and way of using social media is just getting started.

== Critisism and ethcial concerns of consumerism on social media ==
=== Concerns for life satisfaction and materialistic values ===
Social media is linked with the increased opportunity to consume, pursue materialistic desires and view content which reinforces material values such as influencer content and ads. The realm of social media consistently glorifies wealth and luxury, revealing glamourous lifestyles within its content. This is concerning for some thinkers due to the positive associations found with social media use and materialisitc values. Not only is this of concern but the increase in conspicuous consumption, a manifestation of materialism and materialistic content, suggesting social media may have some power in shaping belief systems. For many critics this is concerning as it may impact how individuals experience life and what consumers believe to be a source of happiness; underlying that negative consequesnces of materailism can not be ignored within a fast moving socialty and in an age of social media. However, it is important to note that correlation is not necessarily causation.

==== materialistic values and life satisfaction ====
Materialism is defined as 'the attitude that material goods and worldly possessions contribute to the highest value in life'. However, it is important to note that thinkers argue that materialistic values and placing external rewards as a source of happiness does not guarantee life satisfaction or fulfillment. In fact this area of research has shown that there is a negative correlation between materialism and materialistic values to life satisfaction. Social media can be empirically criticised for this exact reason, argued that imposing material values on consumers may harm an individuals perception on what provides meaning and satisfaction in their lives. Futhermore, consumers life satisfaction may be threatened through other factors influencing their consumption such as fear of mission out and social compariosn, seen to be factors in triggering audience conspicuous consumption.
